The Dean Nunataks are a pair of nunataks lying about  east-northeast of Mount Moses in the Hudson Mountains. They were mapped by the United States Geological Survey from ground surveys and U.S. Navy air photos, 1960–66, and were named by the Advisory Committee on Antarctic Names for William S. Dean of Pleasanton, Texas, who served as ham radio contact in the U.S. for the Ellsworth Land Survey party of 1968–69, and for other United States Antarctic Research Program field parties over a three-year period.

References
 

Hudson Mountains
Nunataks of Ellsworth Land